The Summit for Democracy is a virtual summit hosted by the United States "to renew democracy at home and confront autocracies abroad". The first summit was held on December 9–10, 2021. The three themes are defending against authoritarianism, addressing and fighting corruption, and advancing respect for human rights.

The second Summit will be held in March 2023.

Event chronology

1st summit in 2021
The schedule was as follows:

Day 1
With opening remarks from United States President Joe Biden, the New Zealand Prime Minister Jacinda Ardern made remarks about bolstering democratic resilience in the age of COVID-19 followed by panel discussions. Next topic was about preventing corruption since the conference coincided with the two-day International Anti-Corruption Day and Human Rights Day.

Day 2
Discussions about protecting human rights considered the issue of empowering human rights defenders and independent media. During the intersession remarks, Hong Kong democracy activist Nathan Law made a speech. Discussions about strengthening democratic institutions and preventive measures to stop authoritarianism from happening were held. Threats to democracy in the digital age were also discussed regarding digital surveillance. The day ended with closing remarks from Biden.

List of invited participants

1st summit in 2021

The United States invited itself and the following countries and territories, incl. Japan, to attend the summit.

Criticism
The summit's guestlist was criticized for inviting participants based on the political interests of the United States, not on its democracy ratings. University of Sydney politics professor John Keane said the guestlist was a "cynically drawn up, bureaucratically crafted, agency-structured invitation list that includes states that by any measure are falling way down the democracy rankings or aren't democracies at all".

Philippine President Rodrigo Duterte, accused of crimes against humanity, accepted President Biden's invitation to join the Summit for Democracy. According to ICHRP Chairperson Peter Murphy, "Duterte’s reign of terror and mass murder, which have provoked an ICC investigation of crimes against humanity, would seem to disqualify him from providing advice on anything except fascist populism, repression and human rights violations."

Despite several democracy watchdogs calling  Brazil as backsliding democracies and Indonesia and Nigeria as other types of democracy, Pakistan as a banana republic. Former Brazilian President Jair Bolsonaro, Indonesian President Joko Widodo and Nigerian President Muhammadu Buhari participated in the Summit for Democracy. Japanese Prime Minister Fumio Kishida, Canadian Prime Minister Justin Trudeau and former Australian Prime Minister Scott Morrison also participated in the summit, but former Pakistani Prime Minister Imran Khan did not.
 
Some invited countries, such as Angola, the Democratic Republic of the Congo and Iraq, were deemed "not free" in the democracy watchdog Freedom House's latest "Freedom in the World" report. Other invited countries, such as Pakistan, Indonesia, Nigeria, India and Senegal, were deemed "partly free" in the report while Brazil, the United States, Japan, Canada, Australia and Costa Rica were deemed "free." The report also showed the United States, Japan, Canada and Australia to be developed democracies and Brazil to be developing democracy.

See also
 CPC and World Political Parties Summit

Notes

References

2021 conferences
2021 in American politics
2021 in international relations
December 2021 events in the United States
International conferences in the United States
Presidency of Joe Biden